PlatineDispositif is an independent Japanese video game developer, consisting solely of an individual with the pseudonym AEjuMurasame. The genres of the games are varied, but mostly consist of titles imitating early and mid 1990s console productions such as traditional shooters and metroidvania games. Most of his games are released for PC in varying forms, but some have been rereleased through the PlayStation Network.

Games
Gundemonium – 2003 – A side-scrolling bullet hell shooter.
DicingKnight.
Zangura - 2004
Super Zangura - 2022 - A PS4 remaster of Zangura.GundeadliGne – Sequel to Gundemonium.Gundemonium Collection – Sequel to Gundemonium and GundeadliGne.Gundemoniums - 2018 - A PS4 remaster of Gundemonium.Hitogata Happa – Top-scrolling bullet hell shooter with elements from the Gundemonium games. More powerful player characters are bought after each stage and the player only loses when the stage timer runs out.Engage to Jabberwock – 2004 – A Gauntlet type game, with manic shooter elements.Meido-san o Migi ni – 2004Royal Edoma Engine – 2005 – An isometric shooter akin to Eliminator, where the character is constantly advancing on a road with enemies and obstacles.Bunny Must Die: Chelsea and the 7 Devils – 2006 – A 2D metroidvania title designed to be cleared twice. Clearing the game once alters the stage design and boss order and switches to another playable character.Dandelion – Starchild Journey – 2006Beyond Fallendom'' - 2016 - A Top Down adventure game in the style of Zelda A Link To The Past.

References

Video game companies of Japan
Video game development companies
Doujin soft developers